The discography of British electronic music producer and DJ Mat Zo comprises three studio albums, one compilation album, thirty six singles, and seventeen extended plays.

Albums

Studio albums

Compilation albums

Extended plays

Singles

As lead artist

As featuring artist

As MRSA

As Roll Cage

Remixes

References

Electronic music discographies